Trickle Up is a nonprofit international development organization that empowers people living in extreme poverty, defined as less than $1.90 a day. Trickle Up's primary focus and expertise is reaching the most vulnerable and excluded women, people with disabilities, members of indigenous groups, and refugees in the Americas, Africa, and India. These groups are disproportionately affected by extreme poverty. They are also the most likely to be beyond the reach of government programs and other anti-poverty NGOs.

Since 1979, Trickle Up has helped 250,000 women and families gain the skills and confidence to achieve greater economic self-sufficiency and connection with their communities. When women succeed, so can their children and families. Since five people benefit for each woman reached on average, Trickle Up has helped one million people in its first 37 years.

Trickle Up provides participants with seed capital grants, skills training and coaching, and the support they need to create small businesses. Trickle Up connects them to savings groups where they save money and access credit with others, create plans for the future, and enact change in their communities. Trickle Up helps people connect with others in their villages, build self-confidence, and find their voice because poverty is about more than just money—it is about exclusion.

Trickle Up is committed to the global goal to eradicate extreme poverty by 2030. Trickle Up's goal in the next five years is to lift more than a million people out of extreme poverty. To make it happen, Trickle Up has established partnerships with local organizations, global institutions, and governments who have the capacity to reach far more of the poorest than they could ever reach working alone.

History
Trickle Up has been a pioneer graduating people out of extreme poverty since 1979, when it was founded by Glen Leet and Mildred Robbins Leet.

Trickle Up was born when the Leets traveled to one of the Caribbean’s poorest nations, Dominica, where they recognized what other poverty alleviation programs were missing: even the world's lowest income people have entrepreneurial potential. The model they created was simple and effective. With the assistance of local agencies and $1000 of their own money, Glen and Mildred gave ten people grants of $100 to launch their own microenterprises. The Leets provided them with Trickle Up business plans and reports to track business expenses and earnings. New business activities ranged from building blocks to selling eggs, jams, and school uniforms. Some of those businesses are still operating today. Results are overwhelmingly positive in terms of quality of life improvements for the participants.

Program
Today, Trickle Up uses an evidence-based approach, Graduation, to address the unique complexities of extreme poverty. The sequenced and time-bound Graduation Approach, based on BRAC's Targeting Ultra Poor (TUP) Program - The Graduation Approach, combines careful participant selection, livelihood planning and market research, training and coaching, and savings to build a ladder of support for participants to move out of poverty.
 
As a founding partner in the CGAP-Ford Foundation Graduation Program, Trickle Up is part of a consortium of ten NGOs working in eight countries in Asia, Africa, and the Americas to determine how the Graduation Approach can sustainably lift people out of extreme poverty. Trickle Up now uses and promotes the Graduation Approach globally, integrating participants into self-help groups to promote both social and financial inclusion.

Trickle Up's approach to Graduation is an adaptable program specifically designed to meet the needs of the most vulnerable people living in extreme poverty. The program puts people at the center of their own development, where they gain livelihoods skills and financial literacy, consumption support and risk-free capital, a safe place to save and access credit, and continuous coaching. Women and their families become more resilient, self-sufficient, and confident, and become full participants in the economic and social lives of their communities.

Trickle Up helps women take a series of steps on the path toward greater economic self-sufficiency. First, women are carefully selected through a participatory process and join a savings group or self-help group (SHG) of other women from their villages. They receive a grant to start business activities such as opening a small shop, rearing chickens or goats, or weaving garments they can sell at local markets. They learn to save, access credit, build skills, and support one another as peers. Women in the program also receive one-on-one coaching, which is important for building confidence and developing livelihood plans for the future.

Trickle Up integrates learning objectives into all programs in order to increase the effectiveness, efficiency, and scalability of anti-poverty programs. These evaluations are designed to build on the existing evidence base about the Graduation Approach, including:  
 Six randomized control trials conducted by Innovations for Poverty Action between 2006 and 2014 demonstrated that the Graduation Approach increased incomes and household consumption.
 Evidence from BRAC in Bangladesh showed the Graduation Approach increases participants’ overall earnings, savings, assets, consumption, and diversification of income sources, and that these improvements continued even seven years later.
 Research on the Targeting the Ultra Poor program by Bandhan in West Bengal also showed positive effects of Graduation across all categories of outcomes (consumption, assets, income, food security, financial stability, time spent working, and physical and mental health) over a seven-year period.
 Research in Ghana showed that the full suite of Graduation components is more effective than the asset transfer alone in increasing household assets and creating sustainable livelihoods.

Trickle Up's monitoring and evaluation system, based on quantitative and qualitative data, mobile data collection, and participatory approaches, asks the following sets of questions to measure project results:
 Financial inclusion: How much and how often are women saving money? Are they accessing credit and taking out loans? Are they participating in their savings groups and linking to formal banks?
 Productive livelihoods: Are women participating in dignified occupations? Have they diversified their livelihoods? Has the necessity to migrate for work decreased? Has income increased? Do families have more productive assets?
 Food security and health: Are women and their families eating more often? Are their meals more nutritious? Have women created kitchen gardens and improved their growing practices? Do families have access to quality health services, especially in pregnancy?
 Social and political empowerment: Have women become decision-makers in their households? Have they been educated as advocates for rights and disability inclusion? Are women participating in the local government and accessing government services?

Trickle Up analyzes the following outcomes for participants, families, and communities to define and measure success:  
 Increased household income, savings, and financial literacy.   
 Increased participant capacity to access and manage appropriate savings and credit tools.   
 Increased participant and community knowledge of government services, sexual and reproductive health and rights, and rights of people with disabilities.   
 Increased capacity of municipal agencies, national government programs, and international organizations to effectively serve constituents in extreme poverty.   
 Documentation of results and lessons learned to share with the Graduation community and others targeting vulnerable groups.

Leadership
William M. Abrams is the president of Trickle Up. Mr. Abrams joined Trickle Up following a career as a senior executive and journalist for The New York Times, ABC News, and The Wall Street Journal.

Funding
Trickle Up is funded by individuals, corporations, and government and multilateral organizations.

Awards
Trickle Up is a two-time recipient the InterAction Disability Inclusion Award, in 2014 and 2009, making it the only organization to win the award twice. The award recognized Trickle Up's long commitment to serving people with disabilities as part of the organization's work helping the poorest and most vulnerable take the first steps out of extreme poverty.

Samuel A. Worthington, president and CEO of InterAction, the largest alliance of U.S.-based international NGOs said: “The award honors InterAction members striving to ensure that everyone – including individuals with disabilities – has the opportunity to build a better future for themselves and their families. Trickle Up demonstrates a deep commitment to including people with disabilities across all of their programming.”

Accountability
Trickle Up is one of four nonprofits recommended by ImpactMatters after passing a rigorous impact audit, certifying Trickle Up. Trickle Up's impact was independently verified by ImpactMatters in December 2015. A nonprofit evaluator helping donors identify effective charitable organizations through “impact audits” of their data and evidence, ImpactMatters certified Trickle Up as an organization “with proven impact” and one “that is changing the world.”
  
In 2018, Trickle Up received a four-star rating from Charity Navigator.

Trickle Up has held Special Consultative Status with the United Nations Economic and Social Council since 1987.

References

Trickle Up Financial Statement 2015
Trickle Up Annual Report 2015
Independent Charities, America. "Trickle Up Program, Inc." Independent Charities of America Website retrieved 04/16/08
The Charity Navigator Website
Vimala Palaniswamy, "Grants versus Loans"
Trickle Up Financials
Trickle Up catalogued 
UNESC Special Consultative Groups

External links

ImpactMatters
Independent Charities of America Website

International development agencies
Poverty activism